Kuukua Eshun is a Ghanaian-American film director, artist and writer. Kuukua raises awareness about social issues and mental health through her writing and film. She is the co-founder of Boxedkids.

Career
Kuukua's first film titled Artist, Act of Love won an award at the worldwide women's films festival for best visual effect. She is the co-founder of Skate Gal Club. Kuukua believes in gender equity which has pushed her to protest a lot on the streets of Accra. She collaborated with UNFPA Ghana to hold a healing session for young women who are survivors of sexual assault.

Kuukua recently worked with Nigerian musician Wizkid where she directed a performance for him.

Kuukua got her recent documentary film "Unveiling" premiered at the Museum Ostwall Im Dortmunder U in Germany and its showing in the museum till March 2022. The film was commissioned by the ANO Institute of Arts & Knowledge and produced and directed by Kuukua.

Kuukua also directed Nigerian Musician Wizkid's short film for his Made In Lagos album titled Made In Lagos Deluxe Film which was released in December 2021. She co-directed this short film with Wizkid.

Filmography

Short films

Awards and recognition
 Urbanworld Film Festival Finalists for Young Creators Showcase.

External links

References

Ghanaian film directors
Ghanaian women film directors
Ghanaian film producers
Ghanaian writers
Ghanaian women writers
Ghanaian women film producers
Year of birth missing (living people)
Living people